Dr. Hari Singh Gour University (Dr Harisingh Gour Vishwavidyalaya), formerly and more popularly known as Sagar University or University of Saugor, is a central university in the city of Sagar, the state of Madhya Pradesh or (MP), India. It was formerly named "Sagar University" when founded on 18 July 1946, during the British Raj. In February 1983 the name was changed to that of Sir Hari Singh Gour, the University's founder, by the State Government. It is the oldest university in Madhya Pradesh. Admission in University is granted  via entrance exam conducted by University annually .

History
Being the oldest affiliating university of Madhya Pradesh, most colleges of the state such as the Government Science College, Jabalpur, the oldest science college of India, and Government Engineering College, Jabalpur, the oldest engineering college of central India, were affiliated with this university until more universities were established.

Campus
The main campus of the university is in Sagar City on Patharia hills, sprawling over 850 hectares of land, and the university also has several affiliated colleges and a distance education wing. A medical college is being built to train students in medical science.
 
There are separate hostels within the campus for boys and girls pursuing various programmes up to doctoral level. Also, a stadium, gymnasiums, a sports complex, playgrounds and an open-air theatre are also available to cater the extra-curricular requirements of the students. The campus is fully free Wi-Fi enabled.

School and departments
The university offers courses at all levels such as bachelor's, masters, doctorate, diploma, and certificate. It also offers distance education programmes. This university has several departments that offer specialised courses in the following fields and disciplines:

 Adult & Continuing Education
 Ancient Indian History, Culture and Archaeology
 Anthropology
 Applied Geology
 Applied Microbiology 
 Bio-Technology
 Botany
 Business Management
 Central Instrumentation Centre
 Chemistry
 Commerce
 Communication & Journalism
 Computer Science & Application
 Criminology & Forensic Science
 Disaster Management
 Ecological & Environmental Sciences
 Economics
 Education
 English and European Languages
 Finance Officer
 Fine Arts and Performing Arts
 General & Applied Geography
 Hindi
 History
 Industrial & Pharmaceutical Chemistry
 Institute of Distance Education
 Law
 Library and Information Sciences
 Linguistics
 Material Sciences
 Mathematics & Statistics
 Music
 Pharmaceutical Sciences
 Philosophy
 Physical Education
 Physics
 Political Science and Public Administration
 Psychology  
 Sanskrit
 Sociology and Social Work
 Yogic Science
 Zoology

Library and centers

 University Computer Center 
 University Health Center 
 University Library 
 University Press 
 University Science & Instrumentation Center
 University Information & Communication Technology Center 
 University Works Department

Notable alumni

Rajneesh - spiritual guru
Govind Namdev - theatre and Bollywood actor 
 Yanamala Rama Krishnudu - former speaker of AP assembly
 Ashutosh Rana – Bollywood actor
 Mukesh Tiwari - Bollywood actor
 Uday Prakash - story writer
Virendra Kumar Khatik
Faggan Singh Kulaste
Gopal Bhargava
Bhupendra Singh (Madhya Pradesh politician)
Laxmi Narayan Yadav
Harsh Yadav
D. D. Bhawalkar
Muni Kshamasagar – A Jain Monk
Mahendra Mewati (Actor)
K S Sudarshan - former RSS Chief 
Ramkumar Verma - poet and writer
Dinesh Paliwal - Indian National Congress Leader

References

External links
 Official website – Dr. Hari Singh Gour University, Sagar University
डॉ हरी सिंह गौर विद्यालय की स्थापना की कहानी

Dr. Hari Singh Gour University
Education in Sagar, Madhya Pradesh
Central universities in India
Educational institutions established in 1946
1946 establishments in India